Black Pond is a pond that is located in Wilton, New York, within the Palmertown Range. Fish species present in the lake are  sunfish, and chubs. There is a trail from a logging road along the northeast shore. Private property.

References

Lakes of New York (state)
Lakes of Saratoga County, New York